Carl Kellner may refer to:

Carl Kellner (optician) (1826–1855), German inventor of the "Kellner eyepiece"
Carl Kellner (mystic) (1851–1905), Austrian chemist and mystic